John Gomes is a retired two-star rank Bangladesh Army officer and diplomat. He served as the Ambassador of Bangladesh to the Philippines.

Early life
Gomes graduated from Notre Dame College, Dhaka and the University of Dhaka. He graduated from the Honolulu University with a master's degree in defence studies and a MBA.

Career
Gomes joined Bangladesh Army in 1977 as an infantry officer. He was an operation manager in the United Nations Mission of Observers in Tajikistan. He founded the Morning Glory School and College in Savar Cantonment. Gomes was an accused in the Assassination of Ziaur Rahman case but was acquitted in 1981 and returned to service. He served as the President of Bangladesh Military Christian Fellowship. He is the General Secretary of Notre Dame College Alumni Association. After retiring from the Army he served as the general manager of management support service at Square Hospital.

In October 2012, Gomes was appointed the Bangladesh Ambassador to the Philippines. In 2014, he was criticized by the Bangladesh Foreign Ministry for inviting  Menashe Bar-On, Head of Mission of Israel in Manila, to a private dinner. Bangladesh does not have diplomatic relations with Israel. As ambassador he was tasked with returning US$81 million that were smuggled to Philippines after Bangladesh Bank robbery in 2016. In November 2016, the Government of Bangladesh appointed Asad Alam Siam to replace him as the Ambassador to Philippines.

References

Living people
Bangladesh Army generals
Bangladeshi Christians
University of Dhaka alumni
Notre Dame College, Dhaka alumni
Ambassadors of Bangladesh to the Philippines
Year of birth missing (living people)